The ranks and insignia of the National Socialist Workers' Party of Denmark were the paramilitary rank system used by the National Socialist Workers' Party of Denmark (DNSAP) in Denmark during World War II. Initially, the DNSAP, along with all other political parties in Denmark, were not allowed to wear ranks as part of the Danish prohibition of uniforms. It was only after the German invasion of Denmark DNSAP began to wear ranks and uniforms.

General ranks

Hird and Skjoldunge
 (N.S.U.) was the youth organisation within the DNSAP, created in 1934.

Storm Afdeling
The  was based on the Sturmabteilung.

Initially, there were seven ranks in the SA:

  (Supreme leader of the storm troopers)
 SA- (Leader of several Columns)
 SA- (Leader a Column of 3 or 4 Storms)
 SA- (Leader of a Storm of four Groups)
 SA- (Leader of a Group of 10-20 men)
 SA- (Leader of a Section of 3-9 men)
 SA- (Storm Trooper)

The ranks were later expanded:

Landsarbejdstjenesten
The  was created on 20 April 1941 and was based on the German Reich Labour Service.

References
Citations

Bibliography

External links
 

Danish collaborators with Nazi Germany
Nazi paramilitary ranks